Turbinella angulata, common name the West Indian chank shell or Lamp Shell, is a species of very large tropical sea snail with a gill and an operculum, a marine gastropod mollusk in the family Turbinellidae.

The name "chank" for the shell of this species is derived from the word shankha, the divine conch or sacred conch, Turbinella pyrum, a closely related species from the Indian Ocean.

Synonyms
 Xancus angulata (Lightfoot, 1786) 
 Voluta angulata Lightfoot, 1786
 Murex scolymus Gmelin, 1791
 Mazza scolymus (Gmelin, 1791) 
 Turbinellus scolymus (Gmelin, 1791) 
 Fusus cynara Röding, 1798
 Fasciolaria cardoscolym G. Fischer, 1807
 Tubularia clavata Esper, 1830

Distribution
This species is found in the Western Atlantic Ocean from the Florida Keys and the Bahamas south to Cuba, the Dominican Republic, Jamaica and Haiti, and on the Caribbean coast of Mexico, Belize, Honduras, Nicaragua, Costa Rica, Panama and Colombia.

Habitat

These large reef-associated gastropods can be found in tropical environment on subtidal and offshore mud, on rock or sand beds, and on mangrove lagoons, at depths of 0 to 45 m.

Description
These large shells are heavy and fusiform, with a sculpture of 8 to 10 prominent ribs angled at shoulder. Columella shows three strong folds. The basic colour of the external shell surface is white, while the inner are may be pink or orange.

Bibliography
 Fischer, G. 1807. Museum Demidoff Museum Demidoff 3 - Université imperiale: Moscou. 
 Gmelin, J. F. 1791. Systema naturae per regna tria naturae. Editio decima tertia Systema Naturae, 13th ed., vol. 1 - Lipsiae. 
 Lightfoot, J. 1786. - Catalogue of the Portland Museum 
 Olsson, A. A. & McGinty, T. L. 1958. Recent marine mollusks from the Caribbean Coast of Panama with the description of some new genera and species. Bulletins of American Paleontology Vol. 39 n. 304
 Röding, P. F. 1798. Museum Boltenianum Hamburg. 
 Rosenberg, G.; Moretzsohn, F.; García, E. F. (2009). Gastropoda (Mollusca) of the Gulf of Mexico, Pp. 579–699 in: Felder, D.L. and D.K. Camp (eds.), Gulf of Mexico–Origins, Waters, and Biota. Texas A&M Press, College Station, Texas.

References

External links
 Jaxshells - Jacksonville Shell Club
 Encyclopedia of life
 

Turbinellidae
Gastropods described in 1786